Conrad Shearer (October 18, 1873 – October 8, 1948) was an American politician and businessman.

Born in Somers, Wisconsin, Shearer went to University of Wisconsin–Milwaukee and taught school. Shearer then worked for the United States Post Office in Kenosha, Wisconsin. He then became manager of the Kenosha local trade industry association. He served on the Kenosha Common Council 1913-1915 and on the Kenosha City Park Commission. In 1923, he served in the Wisconsin State Assembly as a Republican. He then served in the Wisconsin Senate from 1929 until his death in 1948. He died in Kenosha, Wisconsin.

References

1873 births
1948 deaths
Politicians from Kenosha, Wisconsin
People from Somers, Wisconsin
University of Wisconsin–Milwaukee alumni
Businesspeople from Wisconsin
Educators from Wisconsin
Wisconsin city council members
Republican Party members of the Wisconsin State Assembly
Republican Party Wisconsin state senators